Alejandro Arturo Vallega Arredondo (born February 18, 1964) is a Chilean-born philosopher, continental philosopher, decolonial thinker, writer, painter, and Professor of philosophy at the University of Oregon. In his work he develops an aesthetic philosophy, in which he engages the aesthetic or pre-reflexive affective, embodied and memorial dimensions of philosophical understanding. In the recent years he has emphasized this approach to philosophical understanding in seeking to extend the field of Continental philosophy, engaging Latin American Philosophy of Liberation and decolonial thought. Vallega has been co-director of the Collegium Phänomenologicum twice and is active member of the director's board. He served in the past as president of North American Society for Philosophical Hermeneutics. Among his editorial activities, he is the editor of the English version of Enrique Dussel's Ethics of Liberation, and he is editor of the World Philosophies Series, published by Indiana University Press. In the last years he has developed a body of art works under the theme of "elemental painting."

Books
Heidegger and the Question of Space: Thinking on Exilic Grounds (Penn State Press, 1999)
Sense and Finitude: Encounters at the Limit of Language, Art, and the Political (SUNY press, 2009-2010)
Latin American Philosophy from Identity to Radical Exteriority (Indiana University Press, 2014)
Tiempo y Liberación (Editorial AKAL, 2020) 
Dussel, Enrique. Ethics of Liberation: In the Age of Globalisation and Exclusion.'' Ed. Alejandro Vallega (Duke University Press, 2013)

See also
Decoloniality
Eduardo Mendieta
William McNeill (philosopher)
Enrique Dussel
Walter Mignolo

References

External links
Alejandro Vallega at University of Oregon

American philosophers
Chilean philosophers
Philosophy academics
University of Oregon faculty
University of Vienna alumni
Heidegger scholars
Derrida scholars
Hermeneutists
Deconstruction
Living people
1964 births